Mary La Chapelle (born April 28, 1955 in Milwaukee, Wisconsin), is an American short story writer.

Life
La Chapelle graduated from University of Minnesota, and from Vermont College with an MFA. She teaches at Sarah Lawrence College.

Her work has appeared in Lumina, Nimrod, Northern Lit Review, Redbook, and First.

Works

Awards
 1986 PEN/Nelson Algren Fiction Award
 1988 Whiting Award

References

External links
Profile at The Whiting Foundation

Writers from Milwaukee
American short story writers
University of Minnesota alumni
Vermont College of Fine Arts alumni
Sarah Lawrence College faculty
1955 births
Living people